May Township may refer to:

Illinois
May Township, Lee County, Illinois
May Township, Christian County, Illinois

Kansas
May Day Township, Riley County, Kansas, in Riley County, Kansas

Minnesota
May Township, Cass County, Minnesota
May Township, Washington County, Minnesota

Missouri
May Township, Platte County, Missouri

Nebraska
May Township, Kearney County, Nebraska

Township name disambiguation pages